Jönssonligan, literally the Jönsson Gang, is a Swedish comedy film series, originally based on the Danish series of films about the Olsen-banden, but later with unique scripts.

The Jönsson gang consists of the leader and criminal genius Charles Ingvar "Sickan" Jönsson, hence the name, and his two companions "Dynamit-Harry" (an alcoholic demolitions expert) and Ragnar Vanheden (a small-timer from Stockholm). Eight films have been made in total, though in the last three films actor Gösta Ekman got tired of his character "Sickan", and was replaced by the following characters, in order; "Doctor Max Adrian Busé", "Herman Melvin" and "Sven-Ingvar 'Sivan' Jönsson". The first two films featured the character Rocky, a Swedish-speaking Finn as member of the gang. He was eventually replaced by "Dynamit-Harry" who first appeared in the second film. Jönssonligans arch-enemy is Jacob Morgan Rockefeller Wall-Enberg Jr. - somewhat of a cross between a business magnate and a ruthless mob boss - who in all the films have been played by Per Grundén. His name alludes to the real-life Swedish business magnates Anders Wall and the Wallenberg family. Wall-Enbergs henchman is Biffen. In every film except for Jönssonligan dyker upp igen and Jönssonligan på Mallorca he has been played by Weiron Holmberg. In Jönssonligan dyker upp igen he is played by Lars Dejert and in Jönssonligan på Mallorca he never appears.

The main series has also created a spin-off series called Lilla Jönssonligan (Little Jönsson gang), which portrays the main three characters of the series as kids. The only recurring actor in all the Lilla Jönssonligan is Loa Falkman who plays Wall-Enberg Jr's father Oscar Wall-Enberg Sr.

A reboot named Jönssonligan – Den perfekta stöten with new actors in the roles was released on 16 January 2015. The film was the first since Jönssonligan & Dynamit-Harry to feature the line-up Sickan, Vanheden, Rocky and Dynamit-Harry and the first not to feature Wall-Enberg, instead featuring an antagonist named 'Wallentin'. The film was not commercially successful. A second reboot premiered in 2020.

List of movies and main characters

Varning för Jönssonligan (Beware of the Jönsson Gang, 1981)

Character: Actor
Charles Ingvar Jönsson (Sickan): Gösta Ekman (jr)
Ragnar Vanheden: Ulf Brunnberg
Rocky: Nils Brandt

Jönssonligan & Dynamit-Harry (The Jönsson Gang & Dynamite-Harry, 1982)

Character: Actor
Charles Ingvar Jönsson (Sickan): Gösta Ekman (jr)
Ragnar Vanheden: Ulf Brunnberg
Rocky: Nils Brandt
Dynamit-Harry: Björn Gustafson

Jönssonligan får guldfeber (The Jönsson Gang gets Gold Fever, 1984)

Character: Actor
Charles Ingvar Jönsson (Sickan): Gösta Ekman (jr)
Ragnar Vanheden: Ulf Brunnberg
Dynamit-Harry: Björn Gustafson

Jönssonligan dyker upp igen (The Jönsson Gang Resurface, 1986)

Character: Actor
Charles Ingvar Jönsson (Sickan): Gösta Ekman (jr)
Ragnar Vanheden: Ulf Brunnberg
Dynamit-Harry: Björn Gustafson

Jönssonligan på Mallorca (The Jönsson Gang in Mallorca, 1989)

Character: Actor
Charles Ingvar Jönsson (Sickan): Gösta Ekman (jr)
Ragnar Vanheden: Ulf Brunnberg
Dynamit-Harry: Björn Gustafson

Jönssonligan & den svarta diamanten (The Jönsson Gang & the Black Diamond, 1992)

Character: Actor
M. A. Busé (Busen): Peter Haber
Ragnar Vanheden: Ulf Brunnberg
Dynamit-Harry: Björn Gustafson

Jönssonligans största kupp (The Jönsson Gang's Greatest Robbery, 1994)

Character: Actor
Herman Melvin (Mellis): Stellan Skarsgård
Ragnar Vanheden: Ulf Brunnberg
Dynamit-Harry: Björn Gustafson

Jönssonligan spelar högt (The Jönsson Gang at High Stakes, 2000)

Character: Actor
Sven-Ingvar Jönsson (Sivan): Johan Ulveson
Ragnar Vanheden: Ulf Brunnberg
Dynamit-Harry: Björn Gustafson

Reboot (I)

Den perfekta stöten (The Master Plan, 2015)

Character: Actor
Charles-Ingvar Jönsson (Sickan): Simon J. Berger
Ragnar Vanheden: Alexander Karim
Dynamit-Harry: Torkel Petersson
Rocky: Susanne Thorson

Reboot (II)

Se upp för Jönssonligan (Watch Out for the Jönsson Gang, 2020)

Character: Actor
Charles-Ingvar Jönsson (Sickan): Henrik Dorsin
Ragnar Vanheden: Anders Johansson
Dynamit-Harry: David Sundin

Lilla Jönssonligan (Young Jönsson Gang)
 Lilla Jönssonligan och cornflakeskuppen (Young Jönsson Gang & the Cornflakes Robbery) (1996)
 Lilla Jönssonligan på styva linan (Young Jönsson Gang Showing Off) (1997)
 Lilla Jönssonligan på kollo (Young Jönsson Gang at Summer Camp) (2004)
 Lilla Jönssonligan och stjärnkuppen (Young Jönsson Gang & the Star Robbery) (2006)

In other media
Jönssonligan has also featured in two adventure computer games and in comics, both incarnations incited by the Swedish cartoonist Per Demervall.

Games
 Jönssonligan: Jakten på Mjölner, 1999
 Jönssonligan går på djupet, 2000

Comics
Jönssonligan – Tajmat och klart, 1993
Jönssonligan – På fri fot, 1998

See also
Olsen Gang

References

External links
IMDB search for Jönssonligan
Banden Fanklub Tyskland - German fanclub with Jönssonligan

 
Swedish film series
Swedish comedy films
Film series introduced in 1981